Smith-Taylor Cabin is an historic Adirondack style log cabin located in Coecles Harbor on Taylor's Island (Cedar Island) at Shelter Island in Suffolk County, New York. The original cabin was built around 1900 by Francis Marion Smith of "20 Mule Team Borax" fame.  In 1937 S. Gregory Taylor (Soterios Gregorios Tavoulares) added a bedroom, bathroom, kitchen, foyer, and landmark tower with catwalk.

It was added to the New York State and National Register of Historic Places in 2007.

References

Houses on the National Register of Historic Places in New York (state)
Houses completed in 1937
Log cabins in the United States
Houses in Suffolk County, New York
National Register of Historic Places in Suffolk County, New York
Log buildings and structures on the National Register of Historic Places in New York (state)
1937 establishments in New York (state)